The Uzbekistan national beach soccer team represents Uzbekistan in international beach soccer competitions and is controlled by the UFF, the governing body for football in Uzbekistan.

Current squad
The following players were called up  for 2015 AFC Beach Soccer Championship in Qatar from 23–28 March 2015.

Tournament Records

AFC Beach Soccer Championship

Note: Win in Common Time W = 3 Points / Win in Extra Time WE = 2 Points / Win in Penalty shoot-out WP = 1 Point / Lose L = 0 Points

Asian Beach Games

References

External links
 Asian Beach Games squad

Uzbekistan
Beach Soccer